Empleurum is a genus of flowering plants belonging to the family Rutaceae.

Its native range is South African Republic.

Species:

Empleurum fragrans 
Empleurum unicapsularis

References

Zanthoxyloideae genera
Zanthoxyloideae